SS Scharnhorst was a Norddeutscher Lloyd ocean liner, launched in 1934, completed in 1935 and made her maiden voyage on 8 May 1935. She was the first big passenger liner built by the Third Reich. Under the German merchant flag, she was the second liner named after General Gerhard J. D. von Scharnhorst. She was one of three ships on the Far Eastern route between Bremen and Yokohama; her sister ships were SS Potsdam and SS Gneisenau. These three ships were planned to shorten the journey time between Bremen and Shanghai from the usual 50 days to 34. She was trapped in Japan in September 1939 and later converted into an Imperial Japanese Navy aircraft carrier named Shinyo in 1942 and sunk by US submarine USS Spadefish in 1944.

Construction
DeSchiMAG in Bremen built Scharnhorst and her sister ship  for NDL, completing them in 1935. Blohm + Voss in Hamburg built another sister ship, .

Scharnhorst was used as a test-bed for new high-pressure, high-temperature boilers, as the Kriegsmarine wanted to evaluate the performance of the machinery before it installed the boilers in new capital ships. ' had conventional reduction gearing from her turbines to her propeller shafts, but Scharnhorst and  had turbo-electric transmission. Scharnhorst had twin AEG turbo generators that supplied current to electric motors on her propeller shafts.

SS Scharnhorst was launched in Bremen on 14 December 1934.  The occasion was attended by Hitler. A report appeared in The Singapore Free Press and Mercantile Advertiser on 15 December 1938.

Regular Passenger Service, May 1935 to September 1939 

SS Scharnhorst'''s maiden voyage on 8 May 1935 was reported in the newspapers.  One report in the Daily Commercial News and Shipping List (Sydney, NSW), dated 24 April 1935, read as follows:

The UK, Incoming Passenger Lists, 1878-1960, show, for example, that, in 1938, SS Scharnhorst arrived at Southampton, England, at the end of the voyage from Yokohama, Japan, on four occasions, 21 Jan 1938, 23 Apr 1938, 24 Jul 1938 and 19 Oct 1938.  Other years show a similar timetable; that is, four round trips between Europe and the Far East each year.

For example, SS Scharnhorst sailed from Yokohama, Japan, early in December 1937, and arrived at Southampton, England, on 21 Jan 1938, before continuing to Bremen.  The details recorded in Southampton in the UK, Incoming Passenger Lists, 1878-1960 are as follows:

    Port of Departure: Yokohama, Japan
    Arrival date: 21 Jan 1938
    Port of Arrival: Southampton, England
    Ports of Voyage: Yokohama; Kobe; Shanghai; Hong Kong; Manila; Singapore; Penang and Port Said
    Ship Name: Scharnhorst    Shipping line: Norddeutscher Lloyd Bremen
    Official Number: 2737

UK, Incoming Passenger Lists, 1878-1960 show Scharnhorst docking in Southampton on the return journey to Bremen on the following sixteen occasions:

SS Scharnhorst was mentioned in newspapers in 1937.  The Western Daily Press, Bristol, England, on Monday 27 September 1937, published an account of SS Scharnhorst's arrival in Hong Kong carrying survivors of an attack on Chinese fishing boats by Japanese aircraft:

The route to Shanghai developed from 1938 to become one of the main escape routes of German and Austrian Jews, since in Shanghai emigration visas were not required.

The timetable of round trips from Bremen to Yokohama and back continued until 1939.  In the UK, Incoming Passenger Lists, 1878-1960, the last occasion when SS Scharnhorst docked in Southampton on the return journey to Bremen was on 28 June 1939.  SS Scharnhorst does not appear in the UK records again.  SS Scharnhorst set sail for Japan in July 1939 and did not return to Europe.

 End of Passenger Service, Outbreak of War 
In September 1939, at the outbreak of the Second World War in Europe, SS Scharnhorst was trapped in Japan. Being a belligerent nation's ship in a neutral nation, the Scharnhorst was seized by the Imperial Japanese Government and held until ships of the German Navy arrived to escort her back to Europe.

A report appeared in The Singapore Free Press and Mercantile Advertiser on 2 September 1939.  The article was written in Kobe.  Scharnhorst had set off from Kobe on 18 Aug 1939 on her return journey to Hamburg but had returned to Kobe, apparently in view of the current war threat in Europe.

A newspaper report in the Nottingham Evening Post, in England, Tuesday 19 September 1939, reported the following:

A similar report appeared in The Singapore Free Press and Mercantile Advertiser on 9 September 1939.

Another report appeared in The Singapore Free Press and Mercantile Advertiser on 20 September 1939.

In July 1942 SS Scharnhorst was sold to the Japanese government.  Subsequently, the Imperial Japanese Navy acquired her and had her converted into the escort carrier . Her conversion began in September 1942, using steel from the cancelled fourth Yamato-class battleship, and she was commissioned in December 1943 after a month of trials.  She was sunk in the Yellow Sea on 17 November 1944 by the United States Navy submarine .

The story of SS Scharnhorst'' continues on the Wikipedia page for the Shin'yō.

See also
 SS Scharnhorst (1904)
 SMS Scharnhorst
 German battleship Scharnhorst
 :de:Scharnhorst (Schiff, 1935)

References

Sources

External links
 www.simplonpc.co.uk Simplon Postcards (Picture of SS Scharnhorst)
 www.shipspotting.com (Picture of SS Scharnhorst)

1934 ships
Escort carriers
Maritime incidents in November 1944
Ocean liners
Passenger ships of Germany
Ships of Norddeutscher Lloyd
Turbo-electric steamships
World War II merchant ships of Germany
World War II aircraft carriers of Japan
World War II shipwrecks in the Pacific Ocean